César Francisco Burelo Burelo (born 7 November 1958) is a Mexican politician from the Party of the Democratic Revolution. From 2009 to 2012 he served as Deputy of the LXI Legislature of the Mexican Congress representing Tabasco.

References

1958 births
Living people
Politicians from Tabasco
Party of the Democratic Revolution politicians
People from Comalcalco
21st-century Mexican politicians
Deputies of the LXI Legislature of Mexico
Members of the Chamber of Deputies (Mexico) for Tabasco